See You Soon is a 2019 American-Russian romance film directed by David Mahmoudieh. The film is produced by Jenia Tanaeva, and Monella Kaplan under the banner of eMotion Entertainment. The film stars Harvey Keitel, Poppy Drayton, Liam McIntyre, Oleg Taktarov, Joe Thomas, Carles Puyol and Larisa Malevannaya.

Plot 
A soccer player starts to suffer from the career-threatening injury, who later falls in love with a Russian single mother.

Cast
 Liam McIntyre as Ryan Hawkes
 Jenia Tanaeva as Lana Kalinina
 Harvey Keitel as Billy
 Poppy Drayton as Elise
 Oleg Taktarov as Ruslan
 Petr Tereschenko as Danny
 Larisa Malevannaya as Grandma Marina
 Dany D (Daniel Dobre) - as supporting actor

Release 
The trailer was released in July 2019, which revealed the film release date to be July 26 for the United States.

References

External links 

 
 
 

English-language Russian films
2010s Russian-language films
American romantic drama films
Russian romantic drama films
2019 romantic drama films
2019 films
Films scored by Mark Isham
2010s English-language films
2010s American films